The St. Alban's Bay Culvert is a historic bridge in Garrison Township, Minnesota, United States.  It carries the four-lane U.S. Route 169 (US 169) over the head of a stream flowing out of Mille Lacs Lake. It was built from 1938 to 1939 as part of a major New Deal project to create a scenic parkway along the lakeshore. The bridge was listed on the National Register of Historic Places in 2015 as the St. Alban's Bay Culvert at Mille Lacs Lake for having state-level significance in the themes of architecture and politics/government. It was nominated for being a well-preserved example of the Minnesota Highway Department's earliest scenic improvements, its rare status as a highway bridge built by the department's Roadside Development Division—a unit usually focused on overlooks and waysides—and for its fine National Park Service rustic design.

Description
The St. Alban's Bay Culvert is functionally a concrete box culvert. However it has  headwalls faced with random ashlar of local granite. The walls rise  over the height of the roadbed to form a low railing. At either end of the bridge,  panels of a second layer of masonry add visual interest. The culvert opening, often obscured by high water, is surmounted by a  elliptical arch.

Repaving over the years has buried the original  stone curbs.

History
The St. Alban's Bay Culvert was built as a component of the Mille Lacs Lake Highway Improvement Plan, an ambitious New Deal project to develop the road around the northwest shore of the lake into a scenic parkway. The project was an unusual collaboration among the Minnesota Highway Department (MHD), the National Park Service (NPS), and the Civilian Conservation Corps (CCC). The labor was primarily conducted by members of Company 2711 of the CCC, which was headquartered on the south side of Garrison, Minnesota, about a mile north of the St. Alban's Bay bridge.

The bridge was designed by Howard O. Skooglun, an architect working for the NPS.  He collaborated with engineer Harold E. Olson and landscape architect Arthur R. Nichols, both with the MHD's Roadside Development Division.  The trio also designed the other CCC-built components of the scenic parkway.  These include the Garrison Concourse, Kenney Lake Overlook, Bridge 5265, and Bridge 3355, all of which are also listed on the National Register of Historic Places.

Construction on the St. Alban's Bay Culvert began around September 1938. The bridge was completed the following spring, and that summer landscaping was finished in the area by CCC Company 2713-V.

See also
 
 
 
 
 List of bridges on the National Register of Historic Places in Minnesota
 National Register of Historic Places listings in Crow Wing County, Minnesota

References

1939 establishments in Minnesota
Buildings and structures in Crow Wing County, Minnesota
Bridges completed in 1939
Civilian Conservation Corps in Minnesota
National Register of Historic Places in Crow Wing County, Minnesota
Road bridges on the National Register of Historic Places in Minnesota
National Park Service rustic in Minnesota
Transportation in Crow Wing County, Minnesota
U.S. Route 169
Bridges of the United States Numbered Highway System
Arthur R. Nichols works